Date My Ex: Jo & Slade is an American reality television show that premiered on Bravo on July 21, 2008. Developed as the first spin-off in The Real Housewives franchise, it focuses on the dating life of Jo De La Rosa, from The Real Housewives of Orange County.

Premise
Three contestants are invited into Slade's house, every week to live with him and compete for Jo's heart. Every day, one of Jo's friends delivers to her house a red and white polka dot box containing a note and a clue hinting at the day's events. Each of the three guys takes Jo out on a unique date, close to his own heart. However, what none of them know is that Slade can watch the dates. After all of the dates, Jo chooses one of the guys to stay in Slade's house and go on a second date with her, while the others are told, "I think we should just be friends", and they have to leave the house immediately.

Cast

Jo De La Rosa
Slade Smiley
Myia Ingoldsby
Katy Metz
Lucas James Joyce
Chris Gersch

Episodes

References

External links

2000s American reality television series
2008 American television series debuts
2008 American television series endings
English-language television shows
Television shows set in Los Angeles
Bravo (American TV network) original programming
American dating and relationship reality television series
The Real Housewives spin-offs
American television spin-offs
Reality television spin-offs
Television series by Evolution Film & Tape